Thor is the 8th studio album by Wizard, released January 31, 2009, by Massacre Records. It is a concept album about Norse mythology and the god of thunder, Thor. It was the first Wizard album with two guitar players.

Track listing
"Utgard (False Games)" - 4:49
"Midgard's Guardian" - 4:27
"Asgard" - 4:13
"Serpent's Venom" - 4:44
"Resurrection" - 3:48
"The Visitor" - 5:53
"What Would You Do?" - 3:30
"Utgard (The Beginning)" - 6:35
"Stolen Hammer" - 4:32
"Lightning" - 3:29
"Pounding in the Night" - 3:30

Personnel 

 Sven D'Anna – vocals  
 Dano Boland – guitar  
 Michael Maass – guitar 
 Volker Leson – bass  
 Sören van Heek – drums

External links 
 Thor at Massacre Records

Wizard (German band) albums
2009 albums
Massacre Records albums
Concept albums
Norse mythology in music